Schwartzberg is a surname. Notable people with the surname include:

Allan Schwartzberg (born 1942), American rock drummer
Hirsch Schwartzberg (born 1907), Jewish leader of Holocaust survivors under the Allied occupation of Berlin
Joseph E. Schwartzberg (born 1928), American geographer
Louis Schwartzberg, American director, producer, and cinematographer
Leo J. Schwartzberg, P.E., (born 1961), Prominent Structural Engineer and Architect, author of many residential and commercial projects situated mostly in California.